Bottom Dollar may refer to:

 Bottom Dollar Food, an American soft-discount grocery chain
 Bottom Dollar (album), a 2002 album by Nathan Wiley